The 2019 FC Tucson season was the club's eighth season of existence and their first full professional season in USL League One. They previously played in the Premier Development League (USL League Two as of 2019) and won four divisional titles.

Competitions

Friendlies

USL League One

Results summary

League results

U.S. Open Cup 

Due to their ownership by a more advanced level professional club, FC Tucson was one of 13 teams expressly forbidden from entering the Cup competition.

Statistics
As of October 5, 2019

Goalkeepers

Transfers

Loan in

See also 
 2019 in American soccer
 2019 USL League One season
 FC Tucson

References 

FC Tucson
FC Tucson
FC Tucson
FC Tucson
FC Tucson seasons